Bunting Island is the northernmost in a row of islands off Yan District in Kedah, Malaysia. It is also the only one to be linked to the mainland by a bridge. The Bunting Island Bridge connects it to the mainland.

See also
 List of islands of Malaysia

Islands of Kedah
Yan District